Missio may refer to:

Missio, public facing name of Pontifical Mission Societies, the Catholic Church's official charity for overseas mission

People
Egone Missio Fondo Egone Missio Archives
Stefano Missio (1972)  Italian filmmaker

Music
Missio (duo), US electronic duo formed in 2014
Missió, late 1980s Hungarian heavy metal band, see Impulse (band)

See also
Missio Dei, Latin theological term for the "sending of God"
Honesta missio, honorable discharge from the military service in the Roman Empire
Redemptoris missio (Latin: The Mission of the Redeemer), subtitled On the permanent validity of the Church's missionary mandate, encyclical